Anisognathus is a genus of boldly colored tanagers found in the highland forests and woodlands of South America.

Taxonomy and species list
The genus Anisognathus was introduced in 1850 by the German naturalist Ludwig Reichenbach. The type species was subsequently designated as the scarlet-bellied mountain tanager by the French naturalist Charles Lucien Bonaparte. The genus name combines the Ancient Greek anisos meaning "unequal" and gnathos meaning "lower jaw". Five species are placed in this genus.

References

 
Bird genera
Taxa named by Ludwig Reichenbach